Anthurium ecuadorense is a species of plant in the family Araceae. It is endemic to Ecuador.  Its natural habitat is subtropical or tropical moist montane forests. It is threatened by habitat loss. It is currently classified as Vulnerable.

References

Endemic flora of Ecuador
ecuadorense
Vulnerable plants
Taxonomy articles created by Polbot